Childs Island is a small heavily forested island located north of the Stop River in the wetlands of Medfield Rhododendrons in Medfield, Massachusetts.

References

Islands of Norfolk County, Massachusetts
Medfield, Massachusetts
Uninhabited islands of Massachusetts
Coastal islands of Massachusetts